William Lely (15 July 1886 – 30 January 1972) was a Scotland international rugby union player.

Rugby Union career

Amateur career

He was schooled in Fettes College, Edinburgh.

He played for Fettesian-Lorettonians and was selected for their tour of England in December 1908, and played in their match against Leicester on 30 December.

He went to Emmanuel College and played for Cambridge University.

He also played for London Scottish.

Provincial career

He played for the Anglo-Scots side against the Provinces District side on 26 December 1908, while still with Cambridge University.

International career

He was capped once for Scotland, in 1909.

Other sports

He played cricket for Fettes College.

Later, in 1938, he played for Old Fettesians against the School.

In 1939, he presided over the Old Fettesians dinner in London.

Business career

He became a Director of Wallace and Company. They were agents for the Bombay-Burma Trading Company.

He became President of the Bombay Chamber of Commerce.

He later became a Director of the National Bank of India.

Family

His parents were James Durward Lely (c.1853-1944) and Alice Frances Hurndall; and his maternal grandfather was Watkin Lucy Hurndall (1824-1895). James Durward Lely was from Angus in Scotland. Jame's father and William's paternal grandfather was an elder of Cray church in Glenshee for over 40 years.

James and Alice had sons Durward and Cyril, as well as William.

William married Dorothy Ruth Hurndall (1887-1977), his cousin, on 12 January 1915 in Yangon, Myanmar. Her father was Watkin Frank Hurndall (1855-1922), a son of Watkin Lucy Hurndall.

References

Anglo-Scots

1886 births
1972 deaths
Scotland international rugby union players
Scottish rugby union players
Cambridge University R.U.F.C. players
London Scottish F.C. players
Fettesian-Lorretonian rugby union players
Rugby union players from London
Rugby union props